Sándor Kömíves (1897–1980) was a Hungarian stage, television and film actor.

Selected filmography
 Gül Baba (1940)
 Sarajevo (1940)
 Janika (1949)
 Bálvány (1963)
 Haladék (1980)

Bibliography
 Cunningham, John. Hungarian Cinema: From Coffee House to Multiplex''. Wallflower Press, 2004.

External links

1897 births
1980 deaths
Hungarian male film actors
Hungarian male stage actors
Hungarian male television actors
Male actors from Budapest